Gamgadhi is the headquarters of Mugu District in the Karnali Zone of northern Nepal. It lies in province 6 of the seven provinces of Nepal.

Media 
To Promote local culture Gamgadhi has one FM radio station Radio Mugu - 107.4 MHz Which is a Community radio Station.

See also
 2021 Mugu bus accident

References

Populated places in Mugu District